Lahov Graben is a settlement in the Municipality of Laško in eastern Slovenia. It lies in the hills southeast of Laško. The area is part of the traditional region of Styria. It is now included with the rest of the municipality in the Savinja Statistical Region.

The local church is dedicated to the Holy Trinity and belongs to the Parish of Jurklošter. It was first mentioned in written documents dating to 1545, but was entirely rebuilt in 1733.

References

External links
Lahov Graben on Geopedia

Populated places in the Municipality of Laško